Tresarrett is a hamlet in the parish of Blisland, Cornwall, England, United Kingdom. It is in the valley of the River Camel south of Wenfordbridge.

References

External links

Tresarrett; Explore Britain

Hamlets in Cornwall